Supermarket is a 1974 West German crime film directed by Roland Klick and starring Charly Wierczejewski, Eva Mattes and Michael Degen. It was shot on location around Hamburg.

Synopsis
A young drifter spurns help from a well-meaning journalist, but as his he falls further into criminality, becomes involved in a plan for an armed robbery.

Cast
 Charly Wierczejewski as Willi
 Eva Mattes as Monika
 Michael Degen as Frank
 Walter Kohut as Theo
 Hans-Michael Rehberg as Homosexueller
 Eva Schukardt as Anna
 Rudolf Brand as Geisel
 Witta Pohl as Frau der Geisel
 Ferdinand Henning as Peter
 Tilo Weber as Kommissar
  as Chefredakteur
 Hans Irle as Polizist
 Peter Bertram
 Paul Burian as Sozialarbeiter
 Karl Walter Diess
 Heinz Domez as Zuhälter
 Rolf Jülich
 Alexander Klick as Kind der Geisel

References

Bibliography 
 Ulrich von Berg. Das Kino des Roland Klick. Filmwerkstatt, 1993.

External links 
 

1974 films
1974 crime films
German crime films
West German films
1970s German-language films
Films directed by Roland Klick
Constantin Film films
Films set in Hamburg
1970s German films